Statistics of Primera División Uruguaya for the 1997 season.

Overview
It was contested by 12 teams, and Peñarol won the championship.

Apertura

Clausura

Overall

Playoff

Semifinal
Peñarol 3-2 Nacional

Final
Peñarol 1-0 ; 3-0 Defensor Sporting
Peñarol won the championship.

References
Uruguay - List of final tables (RSSSF)

Uruguayan Primera División seasons
1997 in Uruguayan football
Uru